Mukim Melilas is a mukim in Belait District, Brunei. The population was 29 in 2016, the least populous mukim in all of Brunei.

Geography 
The mukim is located in the interior and southernmost part of the district as well as the country. It borders Mukim Sukang to the north and the Malaysian state of Sarawak to the east, south and west.

Demographics 
As of 2021 census, the population of Mukim Melilas had a population of 29: 15 males and 14 females. The mukim had 13 households occupying thee dwellings. The entire population lived in rural areas.

Villages 
There are 3 villages in Melilas.

 Kampong Melilas
 Kampong Bang Garang
 Kampong Bukit TudingAs of the 2021 census, the only populated village is Kampong Melilas.

References 

Melilas
Belait District